The Swienca family was a medieval Pomeranian noble family which held high offices under various political powers in the Lands of Schlawe and Stolp (Sławno and Słupsk) and Pomerelia from the mid-13th to the mid-14th centuries. It is named after its founder, Swienca or Swieca (Polish Święca, German Swenzo; referred to as Swenzo, Swenso or Suenzo in contemporary documents), the elder of two brothers.

In Pomerelia, the Swiencas were transiently the most powerful family after the dukes. In the Lands of Sławno (Schlawe) and Słupsk (Stolp), the region in Farther Pomerania between river Unieść (Nestbach) in the West and the river Łeba (Leba) in the East, the border to Pomerelia, they ruled de facto autonomously under various dynasties until finally the sons of Wartislaw IV of Pomerania-Wolgast of the House of Pomerania made use of their rights as legal sovereigns of the Lands of Schlawe and Stolp and limited the power of the Swienca family considerably. 

The Puttkamer family considers them to be their first documented ancestors. However, historians are divided on this issue.

Ancestry
 Swenzo, palatine and wójt of Pomerelia
 Peter I of Nowe (Neuenburg), "chancellor" and "capitaneus" of Pomerelia, Lord of Nowe
 Peter II of Nowe, Lord of Tuchola (Tuchel)
 John I (Jasco or Jesco) of Schlawe/Sławno, since 1308 Lord of Schlawe
 Peter III  of Schlawe
 Lawrence (Lorenz) III  of Schlawe
 Lawrence (Lorenz) I of Rügenwalde, Lord of Neuenburg, since 1308 Lord of Rügenwalde
 John (Jasco) II of Rügenwalde
 Nathalie (Nathalina)
 Lawrence (Lorenz), castellan of Stolp
 Swenzo junior (Swenska)
 Lawrence (Lorenz) II
 Casimir (Kasimir) of Tuchel

Coat of arms
The escutcheon of the Swienca family consisted of a griffin the lower half of the  body of which is replaced by  a sturgeon's tail, a type of arms known in heraldry as a fish griffin (German: Fischgreif). The fish griffin appears also in the escutcheons of the town of Darłowo.

References

People from Pomerania
Pomeranian nobility
Puttkamer family